Lalmonirhat-3 is a constituency represented in the Jatiya Sangsad (National Parliament) of Bangladesh since 2019 by GM Quader of the Jatiya Party (Ershad).

Boundaries 
The constituency encompasses Lalmonirhat Sadar Upazila.

History 
The constituency was created in 1984 from a Rangpur constituency when the former Rangpur District was split into five districts: Nilphamari, Lalmonirhat, Rangpur, Kurigram, and Gaibandha.

Members of Parliament

Elections

Elections in the 2010s

Elections in the 2000s

Elections in the 1990s

References

External links
 

Parliamentary constituencies in Bangladesh
Lalmonirhat District